King Street is a Lower City arterial road in Hamilton, Ontario, Canada, also known as Highway 8. The western-end starts off beside  McMaster University Medical Centre as a two-way street and passes through Westdale. At Paradise Road, King Street switches over to a one-way street (westbound) right through the city's core up to "the Delta", a spot in town where King and Main streets intersect. (West of the Delta, King Street is north of Main Street. East of the Delta after King crosses over Main Street, King then runs south of Main Street.) From the Delta onwards, King Street then switches over to become a two-way street again and ends at Highway 8 in Stoney Creek.

History

King Street follows the path of an old native trail; it was named for King George III.

In 1815, George Hamilton, a settler and local politician, established a town site in the northern portion of the Barton Township. He kept several east-west roads which were originally Indian trails, but the north-south streets were on a regular grid pattern. Streets were designated "East" or "West" if they crossed James Street or Highway 6. Streets were designated "North" or "South" if they crossed King Street or Highway 8.

Gore Park

Gore Park is located along two sections of King Street East from John Street and James Street.

In 1860, Edward, Prince of Wales (who later became King Edward VII) was in Hamilton to open up Gore Park (town centre) and the Crystal Palace. The Crystal Palace saw various Agricultural Exhibitions. It was modeled on the famous Crystal Palace designed and built in London, England. By 1891 the structure was in bad condition and decision was made to demolish it. All traces disappeared from the site which is now known as Victoria Park.

In 1893, The Right House opened. It was Hamilton's first large department store.

On 30 October 1893, The Sir John A. Macdonald Statue arrives in Hamilton from London, England. Official dedication of the statue took place 1 November 1893. Located at the intersection of King and Hughson Streets. Prime Minister Sir John Thompson in attendance.

Hamilton Cenotaph

The Cenotaph at Veteran's Place at Gore Park was unveiled on May 22, 1923 by Governor General Viscount Byng who led Canadians into France and Flanders. The Cenotaph commemorates the 53,000 Canadian soldiers, 2,000 of them Hamiltonians, who were killed during the first World War. Hamilton's Cenotaph is a replica of the British Cenotaph in Westminster, London by Edwin Lutyens and Hamilton one was designed by William Russell Souter (1894–1971), a Hamilton architect, and World War I veteran. It consists of a huge granite column with an image of a casket at its summit. Two smaller columns are at its side with carved replicas of the equipment used by Canadian troops in the First World War.

Pantages Theatre

The Pantages Theatre opened up in 1921 on King Street, (between Catharine Street and Mary Street), with a seating capacity of 3,500 made it the largest theatre in Canada at the time. In 1930 it was renamed The Palace Theatre. It closed down in 1972. Hamilton one time was home to many Grand Theatres, all of which are no longer in existence. These include, Grand Opera House (James Street North), Savoy Theatre (Merrick Street), Temple Theatre (behind the Terminal Building on King Street), Lyric Theatre (Mary Street) and The Loews Theatre renamed later to The Capitol (King Street East).

The Delta

In 1925 the first traffic lights in Canada went into operation at the Delta. (11 June 1925).

McMaster University
McMaster University moved to Hamilton, Ontario from Toronto in 1930, thanks to the efforts of Thomas McQuesten.

Christ the King Cathedral

Christ the King Cathedral, is a Roman Catholic church in Hamilton, Ontario Canada. The Cathedral was consecrated on December 19, 1933. The cathedral is perched atop a hill overlooking Highway 403 leading in towards the rest of Hamilton and one travelling towards Oakville, Missisauga and Toronto.

CHCH TV

CHCH-TV 11 began broadcasting in 1954 as a CBC affiliate from a studio on King Street West (close to Victoria Park) and a transmitter located at 481 First Road West in Stoney Creek. At the time, all private stations were required to be CBC affiliates. Then in 1961, CHCH disaffiliated from the CBC and became an independent TV station. CHCH-TV 11 studios are now at the corner of Jackson Street West and Caroline Streets. The old studio building on King Street West is now the Westside Concert Theatre.

Terminal Towers

In 1966, Terminal Towers including a new eight-storey Holiday Inn opened on the site of the old transit terminal between King and Main at Catharine Street. It's now called Effort Square and the hotel is a Crowne Plaza.  Effort Square is also the home of the Lincoln Alexander Centre.

Architecture
Modern day architectural developments on King Street include the following, Phase 1 of Lloyd D. Jackson Square (mall) was completed, including 100 King Street West (Stelco Tower) and 1 James Street North (Bank of Montreal Pavilion) in 1972. Then in 1977, the second phase of Jackson Square was completed along with a 9 storey office building called the Robert Thomson Building, but not the department store intended to be its major attraction. Also in 1977, The Art Gallery of Hamilton opened beside the Board of Education building. In 1981, The Hamilton Convention Centre and the government office tower above it opened. The tower was named the Ellen Fairclough Building one year later in 1982. In 1983, 120 King Street West (Standard Life Centre) opened at the west end of Jackson Square. In 1985, Sheraton Hamilton, connected to Jackson Square, opened, boosting downtown Hamilton's hotel space. In 1985, FirstOntario Centre (Formerly Copps Coliseum),a sports and entertainment arena with a capacity of up to 19,000 (depending on event type and configuration) opens its doors for business (one block North of King Street at Bay Street). It was named after the former Hamilton mayor, Victor K. Copps. In 1987, the first of two reflective glass buildings of the CIBC tower (Commerce Place I) opened at King and James opposite Gore Park. The other (Commerce Place II) opened in 1990.

Culture
Hamilton has hosted several cultural and craft fairs since the 1960s, notably Festival of Friends, which made it a major tourist destination. The Festival of Friends, founded in 1975, is the largest annual free music event in the country. Burton Cummings, Lighthouse and Bruce Cockburn have been among the main stage headliners at Gage Park on Gage Avenue. WestJet is a major sponsor of the festival. Hamilton is also home to the Mustard Festival  because Hamilton is home to the largest miller of dry mustard in the world. It's held annually at Ferguson Station, Ferguson Avenue and King Street East at Hamilton's International Village and is another summertime food & beverage festival that features some of the top Blues and Jazz acts in the region.

In 2001, the Steven Seagal film Exit Wounds used the streets of Downtown Hamilton for a period of 6-weeks during a night shoot of the movie's climatic chase scene that features the Gore Park water fountain and the Hamilton GO Transit station, Original site of the Toronto, Hamilton and Buffalo Railway (1892–1987).

Waterfront Shuttle

The Waterfront Shuttle is a free service offered by the Hamilton Street Railway. It has a seasonal schedule that runs weekends from May-to-October connecting Hamilton's downtown core to the waterfront and attractions that can be found there like HMCS Haida and the Parks Canada Discovery Centre. The route circles Hamilton's downtown core around York Boulevard (north), Bay Street South (west), King Street West (south) and James Street North (east). Then it travels north along James Street and the Art District until it reaches the waterfront at Guise Street past the Royal Hamilton Yacht Club, Hamilton Chamber of Commerce and the Harbour West Marina Complex. Then the route hangs a left on Discovery Drive, the site of the Parks Canada Discovery Centre. Also at this site is the Hamilton Harbour Queen (cruise boat), Hamiltonian (tour boat) and the Hamilton Waterfront Trolley.

Major intersections 
Note: Listing of streets from West to East.
Longwood Road, South
 Chedoke Parkway, (Freeway passes underneath the King Street West bridge)
Dundurn Street, North, South
Locke Street, North, South
Queen Street, North, South
Hess Street, North, South
Bay Street, North, South
MacNab Street, North, South
James Street, North, South
Hughson Street, North, South
John Street, North, South
Catharine Street, North, South
Ferguson Avenue, North, South
Wellington Street, North, South
Victoria Avenue, North, South
Wentworth Street, North, South
Sherman Avenue, North, South
Gage Avenue, North, South
Ottawa Street, South
Kenilworth Avenue, South
Parkdale Avenue, South
Red Hill Valley Parkway (Freeway passes underneath the King Street East bridge)
Nash Road, South
Centennial Parkway, South
Lake Avenue Drive
Gray Road
Green Road

See also
 Royal eponyms in Canada

References

MapArt Golden Horseshoe Atlas - Page 646/647/648 - Grids H8, H9, H10, G10, G11, G12, G13, G14, G15, G16, H16, H17, H18, H19, H20, J20, J21, J22, J23, H23, H24

External links
Google Maps: King Street (Hybrid)

Roads in Hamilton, Ontario